Evenwood Gate is a small village in County Durham, England. It is situated to the south west of Bishop Auckland, close to Evenwood.

References

External links

Villages in County Durham